Mare's nest may refer to

The Mare's Nest, a book by David Irving
Maresnest, a video release for All That Glitters Is a Mares Nest by Cardiacs
"Mare's Nest", a song by Cardiacs from On Land and in the Sea